The qualification events took place in 25-26 June in Tel Aviv, Israel and 26-27 June in Constanta, Romania, respectively. Twelve men's teams and 12 women's team qualified for the final tournament. In the men's, host France, 2019 champs Serbia, Russia and Slovenia have qualified based on ranking. In the women's, host and 2019 champs France, Russia, Netherlands and Romania are automatically through. In each qualifying tournament, four men's teams and four women's teams earned spots for the final event.

Men

Israel qualifier 

Pool A

Pool B

Pool C

Pool D

Knock-out round

Romania qualifier 

Pool A

Pool B

Pool C

Pool D

Knock-out round

Women

Israel qualifier 

Pool A

Pool B

Pool C

Pool D

Knock-out round

Romania qualifier 

Pool A

Pool B

Pool C

Pool C

Knock-out round

References

2021